The 1940 Maryland Terrapins football team represented the University of Maryland in the 1940 college football season. In their second season under head coach Jack Faber, the Terrapins compiled a 2–6–1 record (0–1–1 in conference), finished in 12th place in the Southern Conference, and were outscored by their opponents 171 to 39.

Schedule

References

Maryland
Maryland Terrapins football seasons
Maryland Terrapins football